Holger Pukk (also Holger-Feliks Pukk; 14 August 1920 Tallinn – 12 March 1997 Tallinn) was an Estonian children's writer.

During the WW II, he belonged to the Estonian Rifle Corps.

1954–1974, he was chief editor for the children's magazines Pioneer and Täheke.

1951–1990, he was a member of CPSU.

Works
 1958: collection of stories "Seitseteist vaprat" ('Seventeen Brave Lads')
 1960: "Rohelised maskid" ('Green Masks')
 1970: story "Öine lahing" ('Night Battle')
 1974: story "Mida te teate Oskarist?" ('What Do You Know About Oskar?')

References

1920 births
1997 deaths
Estonian children's writers
Estonian editors
Estonian magazine editors
Soviet children's writers